Carcajou is an unincorporated community in Alberta, Canada. It is located in northern Alberta, on the banks of the Peace River, north of Manning.  Carcajou is a French word meaning wolverine.

Carcajou is located in census division No. 17 and is administered by the County of Northern Lights.

County of Northern Lights